The Colorado Avalanche are a professional ice hockey team based in Denver, Colorado, United States.  They are members of the Central Division of the Western Conference of the National Hockey League (NHL).  The Avalanche arrived in Denver in 1995 after playing since 1972 as the Quebec Nordiques. Since the franchise began in 1972, the team has had nine general managers.

Key

General managers

See also
List of current NHL general managers

Notes
 A running total of the number of general managers of the franchise. Thus any general manager who has two or more separate terms as general manager is only counted once.

References

Colorado
 
 
gen
Gen
Colorado